Digital publication apps are software applications used to deliver branded business communications and content. Digital publication apps vary in their specific purpose and execution, and are typically designed to present a look and style consistent with the identity of a particular brand. Design and construction activities for digital publication apps are typically carried out by firms that specialize in this area or, less commonly, completed in-house.

Overview
Typically designed for tablet computer platforms, digital publication apps tend to incorporate elements of rich media (such as high quality video, photos, three-dimensional models, audio) and, when built for Apple’s iPad platform, support the various user navigation capabilities of the iPad such as touch, swipe, and gesture support. Certain digital publication apps also make use of the iPad’s accelerometer and gyroscope to affect navigation through physical user movement.

References

Desktop publishing software